Off the Rails is a 2021 comedy-drama film directed by Jules Williamson, and written by Jordan Waller. This was the final film appearance of Kelly Preston following her death in July 2020 and the film is dedicated to her memory.

The film premiered in London on 22 July 2021 and was released on 23 July in the UK and Ireland.

Premise
Three friends in their 50s embark on a European train adventure to celebrate the life of their recently deceased friend. The friend left them train tickets, on the condition her teenage daughter joined them.

Cast
 Kelly Preston as Cassie
 Jenny Seagrove as Kate
 Sally Phillips as Liz
 Elizabeth Dormer-Phillips as Maddie
 Ben Miller as Dan
 Franco Nero as Giovanni
 Judi Dench as Diana
 Peter Bowles as Vicar

Production
The film was announced in February 2019. Filming began that same month, and would film between Mallorca, Barcelona and London.

Reception
On the review aggregator website Rotten Tomatoes, the film has an approval rating of 35% based on 23 reviews, with an average rating of 4.9/10. The website's consensus reads, "It has a talented cast and an entertaining soundtrack, but the limp and predictable Off the Rails lives down to its title in the most disappointing ways."

References

External links
 

2021 films
2021 comedy-drama films
British comedy-drama films
Films shot in Barcelona
Films shot in London
Films shot in Mallorca
Films scored by Mario Grigorov
British female buddy films
2020s female buddy films
2021 directorial debut films
2020s English-language films
2020s British films